Jeffrey Blaine Budsberg (born 28 June 1982) is a visual effects artist.

He won a 2014 Annie Award for Outstanding Achievement, Animated Effects in an Animated Production for his work on The Croods. Budsberg won the award along with Andre Le Blanc, Louis Flores and Jason Mayer.

He won a 2015 Academy Award in Technical Achievement and was nominated for his second Annie in 2017.

Selected filmography
 The Croods (2014)
 Kung Fu Panda 3 (2016)

References

External links

Living people
Annie Award winners
1982 births
Cornell University alumni